Cryptazeca spelaea is a species of gastropod in the family Cochlicopidae. It is endemic to Spain.

References

Cryptazeca
Fauna of Spain
Endemic fauna of Spain
Gastropods described in 1990
Taxonomy articles created by Polbot